A list of chapters of the Alpha Phi sorority.

Chapters

Canada

United States

References

Alpha Phi
chapters